Fields of the Wood is a religious park of more than 200 acres in Cherokee County, North Carolina, owned by the Church of God of Prophecy.  It is best known for its 300-foot-wide, mountainside representation of the Ten Commandments.

History
Fields of the Wood was the creation of A. J. Tomlinson (1865-1943), ultimate founder of the several Pentecostal Holiness denominations called the Church of God, five of which have headquarters in Cleveland, Tennessee. In 1940, Tomlinson, as head of the Church of God of Prophecy, returned to the area to memorialize the place where he said God had revealed to him the true church in 1903—he having realized that in the same year he had founded the Church in the extreme southwestern county of North Carolina, the Wright Brothers had made their first successful flight in the extreme far eastern part of the state. Tomlinson believed that the same chapter in the Book of Isaiah had predicted both. Tomlinson named the park "Fields of the Wood" after an obscure reference in the King James Version of Psalms 132: 6: "We found it in the fields of the wood." In 1941, Tomlinson dedicated the site with a sermon while church-leased airplanes dropped gospel tracts to fulfill Deuteronomy 32: 2: "May my teaching drop as the rain." Some temporary markers were placed on the site in 1940, but most permanent construction occurred after 1943 under the direction of Tomlinson's son, M. A. Tomlinson, and other leaders of the Church of God of Prophecy.

Points of interest
Fields of the Wood includes numerous markers and monuments, some of significance to Christians generally and others only to members of the Church of God of Prophecy. These include representations of the three crosses on Golgotha and The Garden Tomb; a baptismal pool; "Prayer Mountain," featuring 29 monuments with quotations from the Bible and four markers summarizing the history of the Church of God of Prophecy; and at the top, a "Prayed and Prevailed" marker where written prayers are often left by visitors. Nearby is a small airplane retired from the "White Angel Fleet."

On the opposite Burger Mountain is a representation of the Ten Commandments with letters 5 feet high and 4 feet wide, bordered with 1 foot concrete sections measuring 300 feet from side-to-side. At the top of the mountain a concrete "All Nations Cross" is the outlined on the ground with 86 flag poles flying flags of some of the countries where the Church has ministries. Three short hiking trails lead down from the mountain to restrooms, picnic tables, a gift shop, and a café. The site has no campground or large preaching venue.

About a half mile from the park are related sites of historical and devotional importance to the Church of God, including the house where the first General Assembly met in 1906, the site of a school where 1896 religious meetings included the practice of glossolalia, and a marker commemorating the location of the Holiness Church at Camp Creek, a predecessor of the Church of God.

References 

Church of God of Prophecy
Pentecostalism
American Pentecostals
Churches of God Christians
Cherokee County, North Carolina
Tourist attractions in Cherokee County, North Carolina